Hamamoto (written: 濱本) is a Japanese surname. Notable people with the surname include:

Darrell Hamamoto, American writer and academic
Pamela Hamamoto, American diplomat 
, Japanese motorcycle racer

Japanese-language surnames